The men's 100m backstroke S10 event at the 2012 Summer Paralympics took place at the  London Aquatics Centre on 4 September. There were three heats; the swimmers with the eight fastest times advanced to the final.

Results

Heats
Competed from 10:35.

Heat 1

Heat 2

Heat 3

Final
Competed at 18:35.

 
Q = qualified for final. WR = World Record. PR = Paralympic Record. OC = Oceania Record.

References
Official London 2012 Paralympics Results: Heats 
Official London 2012 Paralympics Results: Final 

Swimming at the 2012 Summer Paralympics